Yoshi's (also known as Yoshi's Jazz Club and Yoshi's Oakland) is a nightclub located in Jack London Square in Oakland, California, United States. The venue originally opened in 1972 as a restaurant in Berkeley, later moving to Claremont Avenue in Oakland. In 1979, the restaurant expanded into a lounge/nightclub hosting local and national jazz musicians.

In 1985, the venue was rebranded as Yoshi's Nitespot until 1997, when it moved yet again within the Port of Oakland. The current location began operations May 18, 1997 with a performance by Tito Puente.

History

The venue began as a Japanese restaurant in Berkeley established by Yoshie Akiba, a World War II war orphan, (who came to the United States to study dance, art, and dance therapy), and her friends Kaz Kajimura and Hiroyuki Hori, the club soon moved to a larger space on Claremont Avenue and began to feature live jazz music. It eventually gained a reputation as one of the most significant jazz venues on the West Coast.

In May 1997, the club moved to Jack London Square during the revitalization of the Port of Oakland, as a 330-seat,  jazz concert hall with an attached 220 seat Japanese restaurant, assisted by funding from the Oakland Development Agency.

San Francisco location

On November 28, 2007, it opened a second  location in San Francisco's Fillmore District, as a flagship of the city's attempt to restore the formerly African American neighborhood (which was uprooted in the 1970s by urban renewal) as a center of black culture and jazz. On July 1, 2014, Yoshi's San Francisco was purchased by Fillmore Live Entertainment Group. On November 1, 2014, the name changed to The Addition, and three months later it closed entirely.

Roy Haynes was the featured performer on the opening night of the new San Francisco location.

Recordings
 George Coleman At Yoshi's (Theresa, 1989)
 Robben Ford The Authorized Bootleg (Blue Thumb, 1997)

Noted performers

El Debarge
Allan Holdsworth
Eric Johnson
Anna Nalick
Arturo Sandoval
Kenny Washington
Max Roach
Benny Green
Jimmy Smith
Oscar Peterson
McCoy Tyner
Freddie Hubbard
Wayne Shorter
Joe Henderson
Pharoah Sanders
Chick Corea
Bill Frisell
Joe Lovano
Joshua Redman
Esperanza Spalding
Diana Krall
Stanley Clarke
Taj Mahal
John Scofield
Anthony Braxton
Jimmy McGriff
John Santos
Digable Planets
Tito Puente
Robben Ford
Jimmy Witherspoon
Pat Metheny
Mulgrew Miller
Abdullah Ibrahim
Dee Dee Bridgewater
David Frishberg
Charlie Hunter
Jeff "Tain" Watts
Art Ensemble of Chicago
Airto
Dave Brubeck
Dave Mathews (solo)
Bonnie Raitt
Booker T (without MGs)

See also
List of jazz clubs

References

External links
 yoshi's.com - home page

Buildings and structures in Oakland, California
Companies based in Oakland, California
Culture of Oakland, California
Asian-American culture in Oakland, California
Japanese-American culture in San Francisco
Japanese restaurants in the United States
Jazz clubs in the San Francisco Bay Area
Music venues in the San Francisco Bay Area
Nightclubs in the San Francisco Bay Area
Restaurants in the San Francisco Bay Area
Tourist attractions in Oakland, California
1972 establishments in California
Restaurants established in 1972